Charles Roven (born August 2, 1949) is an American film producer and the president and co-founder of Atlas Entertainment. He is known for producing the superhero films The Dark Knight Trilogy, Man of Steel, Batman v Superman: Dawn of Justice, Suicide Squad and more.

Awards and nominations 
His film American Hustle was nominated for a Best Picture Academy Award in 2014, as well as in 9 other categories. In January 2018, Roven received the David O. Selznick Achievement Award for his body of work from the Producers Guild of America.

Personal life 
He was married to producer Dawn Steel from 1985 until her death in 1997. The two had a daughter, Rebecca, born in March 1987. Roven later married restaurateur Stephanie Haymes, the daughter of entertainers Dick Haymes and Fran Jeffries.

Filmography
He was a producer in all films unless otherwise noted. Roven was also producer of the ill-fated Atuk with comedian Sam Kinison as the lead. The film was shut down in its first week of production.

Film

Thanks

Television

References

External links

 

1949 births
American film producers
Living people
Golden Globe Award-winning producers
Place of birth missing (living people)